Metropia is a Canadian television soap opera, which aired on Omni Television from 2004 to 2006. The series focused on the lives and loves of a group of racially and sexually diverse young men and women living in Toronto, Ontario.

The show also incorporated aspects of interactive television. One of the show's regular settings was the Hot Spot, a café decorated with the work of real Toronto-area artists whose pieces could be purchased from the show's website, and another was Bang, a nightclub at which a real Toronto-area musician or band would perform a song on each Friday night episode.

The show originally aired weeknights at 10:30 p.m. on OMNI 2, and each week's episodes were repeated on Sunday nights on OMNI 1. However, the show's early episodes attracted low ratings, as it was competing in a time slot occupied on other channels almost entirely by the second half of hour-long drama series, and by January 2005 its weeknight airing had been shifted to 11 p.m.

A total of 90 episodes of the show were produced before the show was cancelled in 2006. The show continued to air for some further time in repeats on Omni Television, and was later rebroadcast nationally on Super Channel and FX.

Cast
 Walter Alza - Andreas
 Sean Bell - T.K. O'Neil
 Claudia Besso - Chantal
 Robin Brûlé - Sophie
 Kristin Fairlie - Cyanne
 Danielle Hampton - Jordan
 Jessica Heafey - Aviva
 Silver Kim - Lee
 Kerry LaiFatt - Phoenix
 Gino Marrocco - Salvatore
 Tracy Michailidis - Marisa
 Barna Moricz - Yuri
 Zainab Musa - Jovi
 Zaib Shaikh - Jayesh
 Yasin Sheikh - Rajeev
 Jake Simons - Greg
 James Dallas Smith - Garth
 Sugith Varughese - Palash
 Mishu Vellani - Surabhi
 Wes Williams - Quincy
 Dharini Woollcombe - Maya
 Deanna Dezmari - Nina

Critical response

The show received mixed reaction from critics. Henrietta Walmark of The Globe and Mail wrote that "A little bit Queer as Folk, a little bit Sex and the City, Metropia delivers a whole lot of gorgeous characters making for a whole lot of hotness and plenty of juicy plot threads. The language can be raw and the hookups are frequent, but there's also sweetness and a natural ambiance among the large ensemble cast. Watching this sudsy reflection of our very own boho culture is a delight even if it does qualify as a guilty pleasure." Jim Bawden of the Toronto Star modestly praised the show as "a showcase for a dozen up-and-coming young Toronto actors".

Conversely, Joel Rubinoff of the Waterloo Region Record called it one of the worst new shows of the year, claiming that it was "so inept it could set race relations back an entire century".

References

External links
 Metropia
 
 TV.com

Canadian television soap operas
2004 Canadian television series debuts
2006 Canadian television series endings
2000s Canadian drama television series
Television shows filmed in Toronto
Television shows set in Toronto
2000s Canadian LGBT-related drama television series